The Split Festival (officially Festival zabavne glazbe Split or Splitski Festival) is a pop music festival held annually, in July, in Split, Croatia. It has been held since 1960. It is one of the premier Croatian music festivals. 

Since its inception, the festival has had over 800 compositions by the country's most famous composers (Zdenko Runjić, Arsen Dedić, Milica Milisavljević Dugalić, Đelo Jusić, Nikica Kalogjera, Rajko Dujmić, Zrinko Tutić, Đorđe Novković, Alfi Kabiljo), performed by some of the nation's best singers (Oliver Dragojević, Tereza Kesovija, Kemal Monteno, Radojka Šverko, Ibrica Jusić, Miki Jevremović, Meri Cetinić, Tedi Spalato, Zorica Kondža) and groups (Dubrovački trubaduri, Pro arte, Indexi, Teška industrija, Novi fosili, Magazin, 777), Đorđi Peruzović, and others.

See also
 Croatian music festivals

References

External links 
Split Festival Official Website 

Music festivals in Croatia
Festival
Recurring events established in 1960
Croatian popular music
Music festivals in Yugoslavia
Festival